Frank Kernan (1931 - 11 February 2011) was a Gaelic footballer who played as a right wing-back at senior level for the Armagh county team.

References

1931 births
2011 deaths
Armagh inter-county Gaelic footballers
Crossmaglen Rangers Gaelic footballers